104.7 Yes The Best (DXYR 104.7 MHz) is an FM station owned and operated by Manila Broadcasting Company through its licensee Philippine Broadcasting Corporation. Its studios and transmitter are located at 6th Floor, Imperial Appliance Plaza Bldg., Velez St., Cagayan de Oro.

References

External links
Yes The Best CDO FB Page
Yes The Best CDO Website

Radio stations in Cagayan de Oro
Radio stations established in 1999